Carlos Alberto Vives Restrepo (born 7 August 1961) is a Colombian singer, songwriter and actor. He is known for his interpretation of traditional music styles of Colombia such as vallenato, cumbia, champeta, bambuco and porro as well as genres such as Latin pop, reggaeton, dance pop and tropical music. 

Having sold over 30 million records worldwide, Vives is one of the best-selling Latin music artists of all time. He is regarded as one of the most influential artists in the world as he has progressively helped vallenato gain popularity globally by combining traditional vallenato music with pop/rock music, forming a subgenre that has come to be known as "vallenato-pop".

In 2019, Vives was selected as #45 on both the Greatest of All Time Latin Artists  and Top Latin Artists 2010s.  by  Billboard.

His hits include "Matilde Lina", "La Hamaca Grande", "La Gota Fría", "Alicia Adorada" (all four of which are covers of classic vallenato songs), "Pa' Mayte", "La Tierra del Olvido", "Tu Amor Eterno", "Fruta Fresca", "Déjame Entrar", "Luna Nueva", "Carito", "Papadio", "Como Tú", "Décimas Del Parecido" (a tribute to Guillermo Martínez, a Cuban-born radio host who resides in Mayagüez, and for whose program Vives was an occasional master control technician), "Robarte un Beso", (a collaborative effort with fellow Colombian singer Sebastián Yatra), "La Bicicleta" (a collaboration with Shakira) and "Canción Bonita" (collaborative effort with Ricky Martin).

Vives is also a successful actor. His roles as the titular character in the soap opera Gallito Ramírez and as Rafael Escalona in Escalona, a story about the famous Colombian composer of the same name, are among his most important and well-remembered appearances.

He has collaborated with multiple artists, including Ricky Martin,  Camilo, Shakira, Maluma, Wisin, Daddy Yankee, Alejandro Sanz, Manuel Turizo, Sebastián Yatra, Mau y Ricky, Michel Teló, Gente de Zona, Thalía, Pedro Capó, Marc Anthony, Lalo Ebratt, Los Ángeles Azules, Fito Páez, Carlos Rivera, Play-N-Skillz, Mike Bahía, Nacho and  Diego Torres.

Early life
Carlos Vives was born on 7 August 1961 in Santa Marta, Magdalena, Colombia, where he spent his first 12 years of life. At that age, he and his family moved to Bogotá in search of a better life. He enrolled at Jorge Tadeo Lozano University and holds a degree in Advertising from the university. In Bogotá, he also acquired a taste for rock, getting involved in the local music scene, and started playing in bars and cafés around the city.

1982–1989
In 1982, Vives began acting in a number of shows and telenovelas including Pequeños Gigantes ("Little Giants" – 1983) and Tuyo es Mi Corazón ("Yours Is My Heart" – 1985). He finally found fame in 1986 by playing the title role of Gallito Ramírez, which told the story of a Colombian Caribbean coast boxer who falls in love with an uptight girl, who was portrayed by his first wife, Margarita Rosa de Francisco. That same year, he released his first album, Por Fuera y Por Dentro. The album, primarily made of ballads, failed to gain any success. 
In 1987, he released his second ballad album, No Podrás Escapar de Mí. Though the title track reached No. 30 on the Billboard Hot Latin Tracks, the album did not sell well. His next album, Al Centro de la Ciudad, would become his last album to feature synthesizer-romantic ballads. Some of the songs got some attention being featured in telenovelas, but the album, just as its predecessors, failed to gain success.

In 1989, he was offered an acting job in Puerto Rico, and upon moving, he took a break in his music career. He is remembered for his leading roles in the soaps La Otra and Aventurera. He married Herlinda Gómez, his second wife (they have since divorced). Vives would spend his time between Colombia, Miami and the city of Mayagüez, Herlinda's hometown, during his marriage to her.

Since 1991

Upon his return to Colombia in 1991, he was offered a TV role that would change his life forever. He was cast in the leading role of a fantasy series based on the life of vallenato composer Rafael Escalona unsurprisingly titled Escalona. He sang the composer's songs in the series, and that's when he retooled his career towards vallenato, gaining national success with the release of the Telenovela's two soundtrack albums, Escalona: Un Canto a la Vida and Escalona: Vol. 2.

In 1993, backed by the band "La Provincia", Vives released the album Clásicos de la Provincia in which he started fusing Vallenato with rock, pop and other Caribbean Colombian ethnic rhythms. This fusion scandalized Vallenato purists. Clásicos de la Provincia, won the Billboard Latin Music Awards Best Album, introducing Vallenato to both Colombia and the rest of the world.

The follow-up album, La Tierra del Olvido would mark a further step in Vives' desire to fusion rock, funk and pop music with traditional Colombian genres. The album gave Vives classic hits such as the title track, and the up-tempo opening track Pa' Mayte.

His subsequent releases, Tengo Fé (1997), El Amor de Mi Tierra (1999), Déjame Entrar (2001) and El Rock de Mi Pueblo (2004), were all commercially successful and were well received by the critics. In 2002 Carlos Vives' album "Déjame Entrar" won him his first Grammy award for Best Traditional Tropical Latin Album.

In 2009 he released the album Clásicos de la Provincia II, which was sold exclusively in Colombian supermarket chain "Almacenes Éxito." The album saw Vives' return to covering Vallenato songs in his own style.

Current
With more than 40 songs written in 2012, the new album was released in April 2013 and featured 11 tracks. The first single, "Volví a Nacer", was released in September 2012 and went straight to No. 1 on Billboard. The second single, "Como Le Gusta a Tu Cuerpo" featuring Michel Teló was released in late January 2013. Carlos appeared with fellow artists Ricardo Montaner, Fanny Lu, and Andrés Cepeda as one of the coaches for the first season of the vocal competition series phenomenon The Voice Colombia, which premiered October 2012 via Colombian TV network Caracol TV.

On 27 May 2016, "La Bicicleta" with fellow Colombian singer Shakira was released as a single. The video for the song was filmed in Colombia in each of their home cities. The song debuted at the number one spot on Billboard's US Latin Airplay chart and number four on the US Hot Latin Songs chart.

On 13 September 2018, Telemundo announced Carlos Vives as the fourth coach of La Voz (U.S.). Vives joins Luis Fonsi, Alejandra Guzman and Wisin as coaches on the Spanish-language version of NBC singing-competition The Voice.

In 2020, he joined Lali, Coti, Ángela Torres, Thalía, Camila's Mario Domm, Sin Bandera's Leonel García, Reik's Jesús Navarro, Río Roma, Carlos Rivera, Camilo, Fonseca, Manuel Turizo, Jorge Villamizar, Pedro Capó, Farruko, Kany García and Rauw Alejandro, Ivete Sangalo, Dilsinho, Rubén Blades, Gente de Zona, Mau y Ricky, El Cigala, Dani Martín, Leslie Grace, Nicky Jam, Ara Malikian and Prince Royce for 'Color Esperanza 2020', a version of  Diego Torres' Color Esperanza. 

In April 2021, Vives joined Ricky Martin for  "Canción Bonita", a song which was critically acclaimed for its fusion of musical styles from Colombia and Puerto Rico. The song was nominated for Song of the Year and  Best Pop Song at the 2021 Latin Grammy Awards. In November 2021, he was a featured artist in the Disney movie 'Encanto' singing the credits song 'Colombia, Mi Encanto' written by Lin-Manuel Miranda.

In 2022, Vives was announced to star in the upcoming Disney+ show 'The Low Tone Club' and sang the song 'Tumbando Muros' for the show. The show is expected to stream in the United States in 2023.

Personal life
Vives was married to the Colombian actress Margarita Rosa de Francisco in a relationship that was closely followed by the national media. Puerto Rican Herlinda Gómez was his second wife, with whom he had two children: Carlos Enrique Vives and Lucía Vives. He is now married to former Miss Colombia Claudia Elena Vásquez and they have two children: Elena Vives, and Pedro Vives. He divides his time between Miami and Colombia, mainly Santa Marta and Bogotá.

Discography

 1986 Por Fuera y Por Dentro 
 1987 No Podrás Escapar de Mí 
 1989 Al Centro de la Ciudad 
 1991 Escalona: Un Canto A La Vida 
 1992 Escalona: Vol. 2 
 1993 Clásicos de la Provincia
 1994 20 De Colección
 1995 La Tierra del Olvido 
 1997 Tengo Fe 
 1999 El Amor de Mi Tierra 
 2000 15 Exitos
 2001 Déjame Entrar 
 2004 El Rock de Mi Pueblo 
 2009 Clásicos de la Provincia II 
 2013 Corazón Profundo 
 2014 Más + Corazón Profundo
 2015 Más Corazón Profundo En Vivo De La Bahia De Santa Marta
 2017 Vives
 2020 Cumbiana
 2021 Canción Bonita [Single]
 2021 Colombia, Mi Encanto
 2022 Baloncito Viejo [Single]

Filmography
 1982 Tiempo Sin Huella (Julián).
 1982 David Copperfield (David Copperfield "Adult").
 1983 Pequeños gigantes (Guineo).
 1984 El Faraón (Capitolino Rojas).
 1985 Tuyo es mi corazón (Carlos Sánchez).
 1986 Gallito Ramírez (Javier "Gallito" Ramírez).
 1987 Tormento (César Augusto Caballero).
 1988 La Otra (Arnaldo Vásquez).
 1989 La Conciencia de Lucía (Alberto).
 1989 LP loca pasión (Julio Sanmiguel "Sammy").
 1990 Aventurera (Juan Carlos Santander).
 1991 Escalona (Rafael Escalona).
 1991 Cadena Braga (José Antonio).
 1992 La mujer doble (Mateo Escondria).
 1992–1993 La estrategia del caracol (José Antonio Samper Pupo).
 1995 La Tele.
 2012 La Voz Colombia (Coach).
 2019 La Voz (Coach).
 2021 Encanto (Colombia, Mi Encanto)

Awards and nominations

Billboard Latin Music Awards

Grammy Awards
Vives has won two awards out of seven Grammy Award nominations.

Latin Grammy Awards
A Latin Grammy Award is awarded by the Latin Academy of Recording Arts & Sciences. Carlos Vives has won 11 awards from 43 nominations.

Premios Nuestra Tierra
A Premio Nuestra Tierra is an accolade that recognize outstanding achievement in the Colombian music industry. Carlos Vives has received 8 awards from 24 nominations.

World Music Awards
The World Music Awards is an international awards show founded in 1989 that annually honors recording artists based on worldwide sales figures provided by the International Federation of the Phonographic Industry (IFPI).

See also
List of singer-songwriters/Colombia
Pop Latino

References

External links

 Official site

1961 births
Living people
People from Santa Marta
Grammy Award winners
Latin Grammy Award winners
20th-century Colombian male singers
Colombian rock singers
Tropipop musicians
Sony Music Latin artists
EMI Latin artists
Sony Music Colombia artists
Latin music songwriters
Colombian songwriters
Male songwriters
21st-century Colombian male singers
Colombian male telenovela actors
Colombian male television actors
20th-century Colombian male actors
21st-century Colombian male actors
Latin music record producers
Jorge Tadeo Lozano University alumni